Tim Armstrong may refer to:

 Tim Armstrong (born 1965), American musician and songwriter.
 Tim Armstrong (cricketer) (born 1990), Australian cricketer
 Tim Armstrong (executive) (born 1970), founder and CEO of dtx, former CEO of AOL and Oath Inc.
 Tim Armstrong (politician) (1875–1942), New Zealand politician of the Labour Party
 Tim Armstrong (ice hockey) (born 1967),  Canadian ice hockey player
 Tim Armstrong (writer) (born 1967), Gaelic singer and novelist
 a television series character